Punjabi is an Indo-Aryan language native to the region of Punjab of Pakistan and India and spoken by the Punjabi people. This page discusses the grammar of Modern Standard Punjabi as defined by the relevant sources below (see #Further reading).

Word order
Punjabi has a canonical word order of subject–object–verb. It has postpositions rather than prepositions.

Transliteration
In matters of script, Punjabi uses Gurmukhi and Shahmukhi. Being "primarily a system of transliteration from the Indian scripts, [and] based in turn upon Sanskrit" (cf. IAST), these are its salient features: subscript dots for retroflex consonants; macrons for etymologically, contrastively long vowels; h denoting aspirated plosives. Tildes denote nasalized vowels, while grave and acute accents denote low and high tones respectively.

Vowels and consonants are outlined in the tables below. The vowels table shows the character used in the article (ex. ī) followed by its IPA value in forward slashes (ex. /iː/). See Punjabi phonology for further clarification.

Morphology

Nouns
Punjabi distinguishes two genders, two  numbers typically with an additional dual  form for a small set of nouns, and six cases of direct, oblique, vocative, ablative, locative, and instrumental. The latter three cases are essentially now vestigial: the ablative occurs only in the singular, in free variation with oblique case plus ablative postposition, and the locative and instrumental are confined to a small set of common nouns. Numeral adjectives do also have locative plural forms, and toponymic proper nouns often have a locative singular form. Nouns may be further divided into extended and unextended declensional subtypes, with the former characteristically consisting of masculines ending in unaccented -ā and feminines in -ī.

Regarding the masculine, "the [extended] case-morphemes, very similar to those of the unextended declension, are added to the obl. base -e-, which is shortened to -i- (phonetically ) before back vowels and is lost before front vowels." The division between feminine unextendeds and extendeds ending in -ī looks to be now merely an etymological consideration, as there is neither a distinct oblique base nor any morphophonemic considerations.

The next table of noun declensions shows the above suffix paradigms in action. Words, from :  ghṑṛā "stallion", sakhī "girlfriend", ghàr "house", gall "thing, matter (being talked about)".

Adjectives
Adjectives may be divided into declinable and indeclinable categories. Declinable adjectives have endings that change by the gender, number, case of the noun that they qualify. Declinable adjective have endings that are similar but much simpler than nouns' endings:

Indeclinable adjectives are invariable and can end in either consonants or vowels (including ā and ī ). The direct masculine singular (-ā) is the citation form. Most adjectives ending in consonants are indeclinable.

All adjectives can be used attributively, predicatively, or substantively. Those used substantively are declined as nouns rather than adjectives. Finally, additional inflections are often marked in colloquial speech: feminine singular vocative nī sóṇīē kuṛīē! "hey pretty girl!".

Postpositions

The aforementioned inflectional case system goes only so far on its own but rather serves as that upon which is built a system of particles known as postpositions, which parallel English's prepositions. It is their use with a noun or verb that requires the noun or verb to take the oblique case, and they are the locus of grammatical function or "case-marking" then lies:

{| class="wikitable" style="text-align:center;"
! 
! Gurmukhi
! Notes
|-
| dā
| ਦਾ
| genitive marker; declines like an adjective. Example: "X dā/dī/etc. Y" means "X's Y", with dā/dī/etc. agreeing with Y.
|-
| nū̃
| ਨੁੰ
| marks the indirect object (dative marker), or, if definite, the direct object (accusative marker).
|- 
| nē
| ਨੇ
| ergative case marker; applicable to subjects of transitive perfective verbs.
|-
| tȭ
| ਤੋਂ
| ablative marker, "from"
|-
| vicc
| ਵਿੱਚ
| inessive marker, "in." Often contracted to c 
|-
| nāḷ| ਨਾਲ| comitative marker, "with"
|-
| uttē 
| ਉੱਤੇ| superessive marker, "on" or "at." Often contracted to '''tē
|-
| vall 
| ਵੱਲ
| orientative marker; "towards"
|-
| kōḷ 
| ਕੋਲ
| possessive marker; "with" (as in possession) ex. kuṛī (dē) kōḷ, "in the girl's possession."
|-
| vikhē
| ਵਿਖੇ
|  locative marker, "at (a specific location)," e.g. Hōshiārpur vikhē, "at Hoshiarpur" (a city). Often colloquially replaced with tē.
|-
| takk| ਤੱਕ|  terminative marker, "until, up to"
|-
| bārē| ਬਾਰੇ|  "about"
|-
| laī| ਲਈ| benefactive marker; "for"
|-
| vargā| ਵਰਗਾ| comparative marker; "like"
|-
| duāḷē| ਦੁਆਲੇ| "around, surrounding" ex. manjē (de) duāḷē, "around the bed."
|-
| binā̃| ਬਿੰਨਾਂ| abessive marker; "without"
|-
| nēṛē| ਨੇੜੇ| "near"
|-
| lāgē| ਲਾਗੇ| apudessive marker; "adjacent/next to"
|-
| vickār, gabbē| ਵਿਚਕਾਰ, ਗੱਬੇ| intrative marker, "between, middle of"
|-
|}

Other postpositions are adverbs, following their obliqued targets either directly or with the inflected genitive linker dē; e.g. kàr (dē) vicc "in the house", kṑṛe (dē) nāḷ "with the stallion". Many such adverbs (the ones locative in nature) also possess corresponding ablative forms by forming a contraction with the ablative postposition tȭ; for example:vicc "in" → viccȭ "from in, among," for instance, jantē (dē) viccȭ or jantē 'cȭ, "from among the people" andnāḷ "with"→ nāḷȭ "compared to," for instance, kṑṛē (dē) nāḷȭ, "compared to the stallion."

Pronouns

Personal
Punjabi has personal pronouns for the first and second persons, while for the third person demonstratives are used, which can be categorized deictically as near and remote. Pronouns do not distinguish gender.

The language has a T-V distinction in tū̃ and tusī̃. This latter "polite" form is also grammatically plural.

Unlike other pronouns, genitive pronouns essentially function in a manner similar to regular adjectives, declining in agreement with their direct objects. Moreover, koṇ and jō are colloquially replaced by kḗṛā "which?" jḗṛā "which". Indefinites include kōī (obl. kisē) "some(one)" and kúj "some(thing)". The reflexive pronoun is āp, with a genitive of āpṇā. The pronominal obl. -nā̃ also occurs in ik, iknā̃ "some", hōr, hōrnā̃ "others", sáb, sábnā̃ "all".

Derivates
Indefinites are extended forms of the interrogative set; e.g. kitē "somewhere", kadē "sometimes". The multiple versions under "time," "place", and "manner" are dialectal variations; the second row of "place" forms are the ablative forms of the first, and the fourth row of "place" forms are the ablative forms of the third.

Pronominal suffixes
Some varieties of the Majhi dialect of Punjabi (documented thus far in Lahore, and the Gujrat district) have pronominal suffixes that are appended to verbs, and which replace dropped pronominal arguments.

Verbs
Overview

The Punjabi verbal system is can be described largely in terms of aspect and mood. Most Punjabi verbs do not inflect for tense—the only verb which does is the copular verb  / . Some linguists have described aspectual forms of Punjabi verbs as being inflections for tense; however, this assessment is flawed as these verb forms can be used the same way in sentences which refer to any time with respect to the situation of the speaker or writer.

The copular verb has two tense forms which can be described as "remote" and "non-remote," as they indicate a metaphorical distance or closeness to the situation. "Past" and "present" can be understood as default assumptions for the times which the remote and non-remote tenses refer to respectively, however, these temporal references are not required of these tenses. Rather, time can largely be understood to exist extralinguistically in Punjabi. The remote forms of the copula,  / , do not resemble the non-remote forms  /  phonetically. The copula does not behave like a full lexical verb in Punjabi and does not form part of serial verb constructions; rather than taking on the meaning of the existential verb 'to be' or 'to become'  / , it means 'being' without any aspectual component. The copula is also not obligatory in a Punjabi clause. A full lexical verb in Punjabi on the other hand, does exhibit grammatical aspect. Due the close meaning of  /  and the copula, they are sometimes described as forms of the same lexeme; however, because they are directly derived from two distinct Sanskrit words and do not function alike grammatically, they are better described as two different but complementary words.

Finite verbal agreement is with the nominative subject, except in the transitive perfective, where it can be with the direct object, with the erstwhile subject taking the ergative construction -ne (see postpositions above). The perfective aspect thus displays split ergativity.

Tabled below on the left are the paradigms for the major Gender and Number termination (GN), along the line of that introduced in the adjectives section. To the right are the paradigms for the Person and Number termination (PN), used by the subjunctive (which has 1st pl. -īe) and future (which has 1st pl. -ā̃).

Copula
The Punjabi copula functions as a class of its own and does not share the properties of full lexical verbs in the language, nor does it take on the role of an auxiliary verb. Unlike these other word classes, the copula does not form a part of verb phrases, and where it is present alongside a full verb construction it generally makes a semantic distinction related to the notion of existence, rather than predicating for the act of being. For this reason, it can be said that the Punjabi copula is not wholly verbal in function.

Forms
The sample verb is intransitive naccṇā "to dance", and the sample inflection is 3rd. masc. sing. (PN = e, GN = ā) where applicable.

References

 Bhatia, Tej K. (1993). Punjabi: A Cognitive-Descriptive Grammar''. London: Routledge.

Works cited
.
.

Further reading
 
 
 
 
 
 

Indo-Aryan grammars
Punjabi language